Simpsonotus is an extinct genus of notoungulate mammals in the family Henricosborniidae from the Middle to Late Paleocene of South America. Fossils of the genus have been found in the Mealla Formation, a fluvial and lacustrine sedimentary unit of the Salta Basin in northwestern Argentina. The genus name honors paleontologist George Gaylord Simpson.

Description 
Simpsonotus had a skull similar to Notostylops, but with a shorter and rounder face. The genus contains two species; the type species S. praecursor, and the double-sized S. major, both described by Pascual et al. in 1978.

Age 
The Mealla Formation was initially described as Riochican in the South American land mammal age classification, and later as Itaboraian, but after the redefinition of the Itaboraí Formation to Early Eocene, the Mealla Formation is Peligran in age.

References

Bibliography 

 
 
 

Notoungulates
Paleocene mammals of South America
Selandian life
Thanetian life
Peligran
Paleogene Argentina
Fossils of Argentina
Salta Basin
Fossil taxa described in 1978
Prehistoric placental genera